Canggu is a coastal village and 10 km beach on the south coast of Bali, Indonesia. It lies approximately 10 kilometers north of Kuta, and presents a much more relaxing atmosphere of dining, cultural and beach activities.

Demographics
The main Canggu streets are Jalan Raya Canggu, Jalan Batu Bolong, Jalan Padang Linjong, Jalan Batu Mejan and Jalan Tanah Barak. Along Jalan Batu Bolong you find the temple of the dead, Pura Merajapati, and the Pipitan Cemetery. Along the beach there are two main temples, Pura Batu Bolong and Pura Batu Mejan, which are both hundreds of years old and were initiated for building by Dang Hyang Nirartha. The Canggu area used to have scenic views of paddy fields and coconut groves but current rapid developments are quickly replacing these traditional views with private villas.

Echo Beach (also known as Mejan Stone Beach) is the westernmost beach in Canggu just before Perenenan. 
Batu Bolong Beach is well known, situated next to a temple. It's famous for Old Man's, a beer garden/restaurant with a large stage. At the end of the road it leads to Sand Bar, as well as many other bars and restaurants. The quieter "Nelayan Beach" is the last beach before Berawa Beach.

While traffic is quite light within Canggu, the main road (Jalan Raya Canggu) is notoriously jammed with traffic. In order to avoid going North-east to the main road, many riders choose to take the infamous Canggu-Berawa shortcut (Jalan Anggrek), which is also often congested due to its narrowness, although cars have been prohibited from accessing it from the Berawa side.

Surfing
Canggu has gained popularity among surfers as a longboard-friendly surf spot, one of the few on the island. Three main strips have developed for tourists - surfers and non-surfers alike.   The spotlight on the area as a surf destination has been helped along by the presence of Deus Ex Machina's Bali outpost, the Deus Temple of Enthusiasm, and its annual contests that focus on classic single fin long-boarding.

Gallery

References

External links

Populated places in Bali
Beaches of Indonesia
Temples in Indonesia